Bill Hickey may refer to:

 Bill Hickey (American football coach), former coach of the Coast Guard Bears in college football
Bill Hickey (footballer, born 1880) (1880–1969), former Australian rules footballer for South Melbourne and Carlton
 Bill Hickey (footballer, born 1886) (1886–1973), former Australian rules footballer for Melbourne
 Bill Hickey (bobsleigh) (born 1936), competed for the United States at the 1964 Winter Olympics

See also
William Hickey (disambiguation)